The 2021–22 Rugby Europe International Championships is the European Championship for tier 2 and tier 3 rugby union nations. The 2021–22 season is the fifth of its new format and structure, where all Levels play on a one-year cycle, replacing the old format of a two-year cycle, with the teams playing each other both home and away.

For all teams competing in the Championship, this year's edition of the Rugby Europe International Championships doubles as the second year of 2023 Rugby World Cup qualifiers for the European region, where the winner and runner-up teams of the two-year cycle, automatically qualifies to the tournament as Europe 1 and Europe 2. The third team qualifies to the Final qualification tournament.

On February 28, 2022 Russia and Belarus were suspended from all international rugby and cross-border club rugby activities until further notice.

Countries
Pre-tournament World Rugby rankings in parentheses.

Championship
  * (12)
    (26)
    (20)
    (15)
  X (25)
    (19)

Conference 1
North
    (37)
    (64)
    (63)
    (56)
    (53)

Conference 2
North
    (71)
    (86)
    (59)
    (95)

Development 
 
 
 

Trophy
  ↓ (27)
    (30)
    (44)
    (34)
    (28)
    (36)

South
    (45)
    (NR)
    (60)
    (38)
    (70)

South
    (72)
    (82)
    (73)
    (88)
    (NR)

Legend:* Champion of 2020–21 season; ↓ Relegated from higher division during 2019–20 season; X Disqualified

2022 Rugby Europe Championship

{| class="wikitable collapsible collapsed" style="width:100%"
|-
!Matches
|-
|

 Georgia awarded 4 points

 Netherlands awarded 4 points

 Portugal awarded 4 points.

|}

2021–22 Rugby Europe Trophy

2021–22 Rugby Europe Conference

Conference 1

Conference 1 North

Conference 1 South

Conference 2

Conference 2 North

Conference 2 South

2022 Rugby Europe Development

References

2021–22 Rugby Europe International Championships
2021-22
2021–22 in European rugby union
Europe
Europe